Ku Pao-ming (8 April 1950 – 19 March 2022) was a Taiwanese actor and comedian.

Ku also performed in Legitimate Crimes (2009) with the Ping-Fong Acting Troupe and its founder Hugh Lee.

Ku died of congestive heart failure on 19 March 2022, at the age of 71.

Selected filmography
Terrorizers (1986)
The Book and the Sword (1992)
Secret Love for the Peach Blossom Spring (1992)
Flying Dagger (1993)
The Great Conqueror's Concubine (1994)
The Heaven Sword and Dragon Saber (1994)
Tian Di (1994)
Wolves Cry Under the Moon (1997)
The Personals (1998)
Romance of the White Haired Maiden (1999)
Treasure Venture (2000)
Art (2003)
Romantic Princess (2007)
Hot Shot (2008)
Letter 1949 (2008)
Down with Love (2010)
Sunny Girl (2011)
Prince William (2014)
The Village of No Return (2017)
End of Summer (2017)

References

External links

1950 births
2022 deaths
Taiwanese male comedians
Taiwanese male film actors
Taiwanese male stage actors
Taiwanese male television actors
20th-century Taiwanese male actors
21st-century Taiwanese male actors
20th-century comedians
21st-century comedians